The BMW P48 Turbo is a prototype four-stroke 2.0-litre single-turbocharged inline-4 racing engine, developed and produced by BMW Motorsport for Deutsche Tourenwagen Masters. The P48 Turbo engine is full custom-built but partially borrows the cylinder blocks from BMW B48 road car engine which had a same displacement. BMW P48 Turbo is the first-ever turbocharged DTM engine to date, replacing the aging BMW P66 Series (P66/1) V8 engine after seven-years of service and conform the "Class 1" regulations that shared with Japanese Super GT under Nippon Race Engine (NRE) formula. BMW P48 Turbo engine currently competes with engine competitors Audi RC8 2.0 TFSI and HWA AFR Turbo 2.0.

Début and public unveil
The BMW P48 Turbo engine was made a first shakedown début fitted with BMW M4 Turbo DTM car on 27 October 2018 at near BMW headquarters in Munich, Germany in the hands of Bruno Spengler. The BMW P48 Turbo engine was publicly unveiled on 25 April 2019 including comparison with first BMW 2002 Turbo engine and made an official race début on 3 May 2019 at Hockenheimring.

Construction
The P48 Turbo engine consists of approximately 2,000 individual parts. The engine's valve acceleration is 2,000 times faster than gravitational acceleration, or 400 times faster than the acceleration of a lunar rocket. The pistons in the BMW P48 Turbo accelerate from 0 to 100 km/h in less than a thousandth of a second – 1,200 times faster than a lunar rocket. Between them, all of the pistons in the engine cover a distance the equivalent of Munich to Cape Town over the course of a season. 2.8 million ignition sparks are generated in an engine over the course of a season. The water pump consumes roughly 18,000 litres in an hour. At this rate, it would fill a bathtub in 20 seconds. The full 600 hp of engine power is transferred to the drivetrain and rear wheels through screws. They weigh just 130 grams – the same as an cube of iron with a 2.5-mm edge. During a season, enough heat for 500 sauna sessions is dissipated through the oil. For the engine's final assembly unit, 1,005 designs were drawn up. Placed side by side, they could cover the floor in a 250 m2 apartment. In the interest of sustainability, these drawings were not printed, but were saved as PDF documents.

Applications
BMW M4 Turbo DTM

References

External links
BMW Motorsport DTM Division Official Website

P48 Turbo
P48 Turbo
Gasoline engines by model
Deutsche Tourenwagen Masters
Straight-four engines